Delfina Veronica Dini (born 7 October 2001) is an Argentine swimmer. She competed in the women's 400 metre freestyle event at the 2018 FINA World Swimming Championships (25 m), in Hangzhou, China.

References

External links
 

2001 births
Living people
Argentine female freestyle swimmers
Place of birth missing (living people)
Swimmers at the 2018 Summer Youth Olympics
21st-century Argentine women